Bangarra Dance Theatre is an Aboriginal and Torres Strait Islander dance company focused on contemporary dance. It was founded by African American dancer and choreographer Carole Y. Johnson, Gumbaynggirr man Rob Bryant, and South African-born Cheryl Stone. Stephen Page was artistic director from 1991 to 2021, with Frances Rings taking over in 2022.

Bangarra (pronounced bungurra) means "to make fire" in the Wiradjuri language.

History
Bangarra Dance Theatre was founded in October 1989 by Carole Y. Johnson, an African-American modern dancer and founder of the National Aboriginal and Islander Skills Development Association (NAISDA), Rob Bryant, a Gumbaynggirr man and graduate of NAISDA, and Cheryl Stone, a South African-born student at NAISDA.

Clive Joseph Robin "Rob" Bryant (later known as Uncle Rob Bryant), born in Bellingen, New South Wales in 1947, was a retired leading aircraftman of the RAAF and a Vietnam veteran. Stone had been born in South Africa, growing up in Cape Town and moving to Australia as a teenager in 1969. She participated in the six-week Black Theatre workshop established by Johnson in Redfern, Sydney, in 1975

Johnson toured Australia in 1972 with American choreographer Eleo Pomare and his company, and remained in Australia. In 1975, Johnson became the founding director of the Aboriginal Islander Skills Development Scheme, now known as the National Aboriginal and Islander Skills Development Association (NAISDA).

Johnson had a three-part plan for Aboriginal dance in Australia. It was to establish a school to give academic qualifications, and train dancers as members of a student and graduate performing company that would also teach. It would further provide a path for the dancers to other dance-related areas, including choreography, tour management, and all front and back of house skills. The other key aim was to maintain authentic cultural continuity, friendships, and close ties to traditional communities. Johnson mentored Stone, who studied alongside the dancers. She  planned the formation of Bangarra Dance Theatre and, in 1989, became its founding artistic director. Bangarra is a Wiradjuri word meaning "to make fire".

Stephen Page has been the artistic director since 1991. Bangarra's first full-length show, Praying Mantis Dreaming, was produced in 1992. In 1994, Page, with Bernadette Walong as associate director, created Ochres and productions have followed annually since 2000. All have been successful within Australia and some have toured the United States and the United Kingdom. The group also made significant contributions to the opening and closing ceremonies of the 2000 Summer Olympics in Sydney.

The company has received the Helpmann Award for Best Ballet or Dance Work a number of times.

In 2019, the company marked its thirtieth anniversary with the launch of a digital archive and exhibition called Knowledge Ground.

In early December 2021, Page announced that he would be stepping down from the role of artistic director in 2022, handing over to Frances Rings, former dancer and choreographer with Bangarra and later associate artistic director. Bangarra's last performance with Page as director was Wudjang: Not the Past, which premiered at the Sydney Festival in January 2022 before touring to Hobart and then Adelaide as part of the Adelaide Festival in March 2022.

People

Page brothers
 Stephen Page , artistic director 1991–2021
 David Page (1961–2016), composer and musical director

 Russell Page (1968–2002), dancer

Others

 Raymond D. Blanco, who featured in the film Jindalee Lady (1992), was former Head of Culture and Training Operations at NAISDA, and the first Indigenous Australian to lead a dance company when he took over the reins of the Aboriginal Islander Dance Theatre in 1991
 Lillian Crombie, dancer
 Ella Havelka, dancer
 Elma Gada Kris, dancer and choreographer
 Banula Marika, dancer and musician
 Ningali Lawford-Wolf
 Daniel Riley, dancer and choreographer with Bangarra since around 2009, appointed as artistic director of Australian Dance Theatre from the end of 2021
 Frances Rings, dancer and choreographer, artistic director from 2022

Works

1992 – Praying Mantis Dreaming
1995 – Ochres
1997 – Fish
1997 – Rites (with The Australian Ballet)
2000 – Skin (Spear, 2015 film, based on this)
2001 – Corroboree
2002 – Walkabout
2003 – Bush
2004 – Unaipon
2004 – CLAN
2005 – Boomerang
2006 – Gathering with the Australian Ballet
2007 – True Stories
2008 – Mathinna, based on the life of Palawa girl Mathinna
2008 — Rites (with The Australian Ballet)
 2009 — Fire – A Retrospective	
 2010 – of earth & sky
 2012 – Terrain
 2013 – Blak
 2014 – Patyegarang and Kinship
 2015 – lore
 2016 – OUR land people stories
 2017 – Bennelong
2018 – Dubboo - life of a songman
2018 — Dark Emu
2019 — Spirit

Discography

Albums

Films

 Jindalee Lady (1992), featuring then lead dancer Raymond Blanco. This was the first fiction feature film directed by an Aboriginal director (Brian Syron).

Spear (2015) – drama film directed by Stephen Page, based on the live performance Skin (2000).

 Firestarter – The Story of Bangarra (2020) is a feature-length documentary film about the dance company, directed by Nel Minchin and Wayne Blair. It covers 30 years of Bangarra's existence, charting the story of the three Page brothers' (Stephen, David and youngest brother, the dancer Russell) roles in the development of the company. The film had its world premiere as the closing night film of the Brisbane International Film Festival on 11 October 2020, and eight days later won the Adelaide Film Festival's Feature Documentary Award.

Awards and nominations

Australian Dance Awards
The Australian Dance Awards recognise excellence and promote dance in Australia. They are awarded under the auspices of the Australian Dance Council (Ausdance) for performance, choreography, design, dance writing, teaching and related professions. they commenced in 1997.

 (wins only)
! 
|-
| 1997
| Stephen Page (Artistic Director of Bangarra Dance Theatre)
| Outstanding achievement in choreography
| 
| 
|-
| rowspan="2"| 2004
| Frances Rings for Unaipon (Bangarra Dance Theatre)
| Outstanding Achievement in Choreography
| 
| 
|-
| Fire - A Retrospective (Bangarra Dance Theatre)
| Outstanding Performance by a Company
| 
| 
|-
| 2010
| Bangarra Dance Theatre for Belong
| Outstanding Performance by a Company
| 
| 
|-
| 2012
| Bangarra Dance Theatre for Belong
| Outstanding Performance by a Company
| 
| 
|-
| 2015
| Waangenga Blanco (Bangarra Dance Theatre)
| Outstanding Performance by a Male Dancer for Patyegarang
| 
| 
|-
| rowspan="3"| 2016
| Bangarra Dance Theatre for Lore
| Outstanding Performance by a Company
| 
| 
|-
| Elma Kris for Lore (Bangarra Dance Theatre)
| Outstanding Performance by a Female Dancer
| 
| 
|-
| David Mack for Frame of Mind (Bangarra Dance Theatre)
| Outstanding Performance by a Male Dancer
| 
| 
|-
| 2017
| Bangarra Dance Theatre for OUR Land People Stories
| Outstanding Performance by a Company
| 
| 
|-
| 2018
| Beau Dean Riley Smith for Bennelong (Bangarra Dance Theatre)
| Outstanding Performance by a Male Dancer
| 
| 
|-

Deadly Awards
The Deadly Awards, (commonly known simply as The Deadlys), was an annual celebration of Australian Aboriginal and Torres Strait Islander achievement in music, sport, entertainment and community. They ran from 1996 to 2013.
 (wins only)
! 
|-
| Deadly Awards 2008
| Stephen Page and Bangarra Dance Theatre
| Outstanding Achievement in Entertainment
| 
| 
|-
| Deadly Awards 2009
| Stephen Page and Bangarra Dance Theatre
| Achievement in Theatre or Live Performance
| 
|
|-

Helpmann Awards
The Helpmann Awards is an awards show, celebrating live entertainment and performing arts in Australia, presented by industry group Live Performance Australia since 2001. Note: 2020 and 2021 were cancelled due to the COVID-19 pandemic.
 

! 
|-
| rowspan="4"| 2001
| Skin (Bangarra Dance Theatre)
| Helpmann Award for Best Ballet or Dance Work
| 
| rowspan="4"| 
|-
| rowspan="2"| Stephen Page for Skin (Bangarra Dance Theatre)
| Helpmann Award for Best Choreography in a Ballet or Dance Work
| 
|-
| Helpmann Award for Best New Australian Work
| 
|-
| Karen Norris for Skin (Bangarra Dance Theatre)
| Helpmann Award for Best Lighting Design
| 
|-
| rowspan="4"| 2002
| Corroboree (Bangarra Dance Theatre)
| Best Ballet or Dance Work
| 
| rowspan="4"|
|-
| rowspan="2"| Stephen Page for Corroboree (Bangarra Dance Theatre)
| Best Choreography in a Ballet or Dance Work
| 
|-
| Best New Australian Work
| 
|-
| David Page and Steve Francis – Corroboree
| Best Best Sound Design
| 
|-
| rowspan="6"| 2003
| rowspan="2"| Walkabout (Bangarra Dance Theatre)
| Best Ballet or Dance Work
| 
| rowspan="6"|
|-
| Best New Australian Work
| 
|-
|Stephen Page for Walkabout (Bangarra Dance Theatre)
| Helpmann Award for Best Original Score
| 
|-
| Stephen Page and Steven McTaggart "Rush" - Walkabout (Bangarra Dance Theatre)
| rowspan="2"|  Best Choreography in a Ballet or Dance Work
| 
|-
| Frances Rings "Rations" - Walkabout (Bangarra Dance Theatre)
| 
|-
| Russell Page – Walkabout (Bangarra Dance Theatre)
| Best Male Dancer in a Ballet or Dance Work
| 
|-
| rowspan="4"| 2004
| Bush (Bangarra Dance Theatre)
| Best Ballet or Dance Work
| 
| rowspan="4"|
|-
| Stephen Page Bush (Bangarra Dance Theatre)
|  Best Choreography in a Ballet or Dance Work
| 
|-
| Jennifer Irwin – Bush (Bangarra Dance Theatre)
| Best Costume Design
| 
|-
| Nick Schlieper – Bush (Bangarra Dance Theatre)
| Best Lighting Design
| 
|-
| rowspan="1"| 2006
| Jennifer Irwin – Amalgamate (The Australian Ballet & Bangarra Dance Theatre)
| Best Costume Design
| 
| rowspan="1"|
|-
| rowspan="1"| 2007
| Clan (Bangarra Dance Theatre)
| Helpmann Award for Best Regional Touring Production
| 
| rowspan="1"|  
|-
| rowspan="1"| 2008
| True Stories (Bangarra Dance Theatre)
| Best Regional Touring Production
| 
| rowspan="1"| 
|-
| rowspan="3"| 2009
| Mathinna (Bangarra Dance Theatre)
| Best Ballet or Dance Work
| 
| rowspan="3"| 
|-
| Stephen Page Mathinna (Bangarra Dance Theatre)
| Best Choreography in a Dance or Physical Theatre Production
| 
|-
| David Page for Walkabout (Bangarra Dance Theatre)
| Best Original Score
| 
|-
| rowspan="4"| 2010
| Fire (Bangarra Dance Theatre)
| Best Ballet or Dance Work
| 
| rowspan="4"| 
|-
| Deborah Brown Fire (Bangarra Dance Theatre)
| Best Female Dancer in a Dance or Physical Theatre Work
| 
|-
|Stephen Page Fire (Bangarra Dance Theatre)
| Best Choreography in a Dance or Physical Theatre Production
| 
|-
| True Stories (Bangarra Dance Theatre)
| Best Regional Touring Production
| 
|-
| rowspan="2"| 2011
|Frances Rings – Artefact (of Earth & Sky) (Bangarra Dance Theatre)
| Best Choreography in a Dance or Physical Theatre Production
| 
| rowspan="2"| 
|-
| Mathinna  (Bangarra Dance Theatre)
| Best Regional Touring Production
| 
|-
| rowspan="3"| 2012
| Stephen Page – ID from Belong (Bangarra Dance Theatre)
| Best Choreography in a Ballet or Dance Work
| 
| rowspan="3"| 
|-
| Waangenga Blanco – Belong (Bangarra Dance Theatre)
| Best Male Dancer in a Ballet or Dance Work
| 
|-
| David Page and Steve Francis – Belong (Bangarra Dance Theatre)
| Best Original Score
| 
|-
| rowspan="5"| 2013
| Terrain (Bangarra Dance Theatre)
| Best Ballet or Dance Work
| 
| rowspan="5"| 
|-
| Deborah Brown  – Terrain (Bangarra Dance Theatre)
| Best Female Dancer in a Dance or Physical Theatre Production
| 
|-
| David Page - Terrain (Bangarra Dance Theatre)
| Best Original Score
| 
|-
| Frances Rings - Terrain (Bangarra Dance Theatre)
| Best Choreography in a Ballet or Dance Work
| 
|-
| Artefact (of Earth & Sky) (Bangarra Dance Theatre)
| Best Regional Touring Production
| 
|-
| rowspan="1"| 2014
| David Page & Paul Mac – Blak
| Best Original Score
| 
| rowspan="1"| 
|-
| rowspan="1"| 2015
| Stephen Page – Patyegarang (Bangarra Dance Theatre)
| Best Choreography in a Dance or Physical Theatre Production
| 
| rowspan="1"| 
|-
| rowspan="7"| 2016
| Sheoak (Bangarra Dance Theatre)
| Best Ballet or Dance Work
| 
| rowspan="7"| 
|-
| Frances Rings – Sheoak (Bangarra Dance Theatre)
| rowspan="2"| Best Choreography in a Dance or Physical Theatre Work
| 
|-
| Stephen Page, Bernadette Walong-Sene, Djakapurra Munyarryun – Ochres (Bangarra Dance Theatre)
| 
|-
| Yolanda Lowatta – Sheoak (Bangarra Dance Theatre)
| Best Female Dancer in a Dance or Physical Theatre Work
| 
|-
| Frances Rings, Deborah Brown and Waangenga Blanco – Lore (Bangarra Dance Theatre)
| Best New Australian Work
| 
|-
| rowspan="2"| David Page - Ochres (Bangarra Dance Theatre)
| Best Original Score
| 
|-
| Best Sound Design
| 
|-
| rowspan="4"|2017
| OUR Land People Stories (Bangarra Dance Theatre)
| Best Dance Production
| 
| rowspan="4"| 
|-
| Jennifer Irwin - OUR Land People Stories (Bangarra Dance Theatre)
| Best Costume Design
| 
|-
| Elma Kris – Nyapanyapa (Bangarra Dance Theatre)
| Best Female Dancer in a Dance or Physical Theatre Work
| 
|-
| Terrain (Bangarra Dance Theatre)
| Best Regional Touring Production
| 
|-
| rowspan="7"| 2018
| Bennelong (Bangarra Dance Theatre)
| Best Dance Production
| 
| rowspan="7"| 
|-
| OUR Land People Stories (Bangarra Dance Theatre)
| Best Regional Touring Production
| 
|-
| Stephen Page – Bennelong (Bangarra Dance Theatre)
| Best New Australian Work
| 
|-
| Steve Francis – Bennelong (Bangarra Dance Theatre)
| Best Original Score
| 
|-
| Jennifer Irwin – Bennelong (Bangarra Dance Theatre)
| Best Costume Design
| 
|-
| Jacob Nash – Bennelong (Bangarra Dance Theatre)
| Best Scenic Design
| 
|-
| Nick Schlieper – Bennelong (Bangarra Dance Theatre)
| Best Lighting Design
| 
|-
| rowspan="2"| 2019
| Waangenga Blanco – Dark Emu (Bangarra Dance Theatre)
| Best Male Dancer in a Ballet, Dance or Physical Theatre Production
| 
| rowspan="2"| 
|-
| Bennelong'' (Bangarra Dance Theatre)
| Best Regional Touring Production
| 
|}

Sidney Myer Performing Arts Awards
The Sidney Myer Performing Arts Awards commenced in 1984 and recognise outstanding achievements in dance, drama, comedy, music, opera, circus and puppetry.

|-
| 1993 || Bangarra Dance Theatre  || Group Award || 
|-

See also
Aboriginal Dance Theatre Redfern
 Dance in Australia
 NAISDA Dance College
National Black Theatre (Australia)

References

Further reading
 
 
  [CC-By-SA] 
Bangarra Dance Theatre at Australia Dancing, Pandora Archive
Knowledge Ground

External links
 

Contemporary dance companies
Dance companies in Australia
Organisations serving Indigenous Australians
1989 establishments in Australia